Lygie was an Italian professional cycling team that existed for several periods between 1922 and 1964.

The team was sponsored by Lygie, an Italian bicycle manufacturer.

They participated in 8 editions of the Giro d'Italia, earning 11 stage wins as well as the mountains classification by Vito Taccone in 1963

References

External links

Defunct cycling teams based in Italy
1922 establishments in Italy
1964 disestablishments in Italy
Cycling teams established in 1922
Cycling teams disestablished in 1964